The Thailand Open is the national golf open of Thailand.

History 
It was founded as an event on the Far East Circuit, later renamed as the Asia Golf Circuit. It remained on the circuit until 1997, after which it became an event on the Asian Tour, where it remained until 2009. From 2010 to 2015, it was part of the fledgling OneAsia tour's schedule, co-sanctioned in 2013 and 2015 by the Japan Golf Tour, before returning to the Asian Tour in 2017.

Winners

Notes

References

External links
Coverage on the Asian Tour's official site
Coverage on the Japan Golf Tour's official site (2015)

Asia Golf Circuit events
Former Asian Tour events
Former Japan Golf Tour events
Golf tournaments in Thailand
Recurring sporting events established in 1965
1965 establishments in Thailand